Carl Frederick Mork (1906-1986) was a South African-born Australian rugby league footballer who played in the 1920s.

Playing career
Mork played for Newtown. He was one of four brothers that played for the club, and his older brother Hans Mork was captain of the club. Carl played two seasons between 1928–1929, which included the 1929 Grand Final.

Mork died on 3 August 1986, aged 79.

References

1906 births
1986 deaths
Newtown Jets players
Australian rugby league players
Rugby league centres
Rugby league players from Eastern Cape
South African emigrants to Australia